"Crush" is a song by the Dave Matthews Band, released as the third single from their album Before These Crowded Streets. As a single, it reached number 11 on the Modern Rock Tracks chart, number 75 on the Billboard Hot 100, number 38 on the Top 40 Mainstream, and number 20 on the Adult Top 40. As the album version is over eight minutes in length, the song time was cut almost in half for radio airplay and the music video.

The song was almost omitted from Before These Crowded Streets as the band struggled with it in the studio until bassist Stefan Lessard came up with the opening bass line that set the tone of the song for the rest of the band.

Music video
The music video, directed by Dean Karr, is shot in black and white. It takes place in a nightclub, with Dave Matthews sitting at the bar drinking, singing, and smoking, while the rest of the band plays in the background. In the end, Dave gets up to take a guitar from a waiter in the backstage room and gets up to join the rest of the band.

Track listing
 "Crush" (edit) – 4:12
 "Crush" – 8:09

Charts

Live releases
A live recording of "Crush" appears on the following Dave Matthews Band releases:
The Warehouse 5
The Central Park Concert
The Gorge (Special Edition)
The Complete Weekend on the Rocks
Live Trax Vol. 6
Live at Radio City
Live Trax Vol. 9
Live Trax Vol. 13
Live Trax Vol. 15
Live Trax Vol. 16

References

1998 singles
Dave Matthews Band songs
Songs written by Dave Matthews
Song recordings produced by Steve Lillywhite
RCA Records singles
Rock ballads
1998 songs